Maria Luísa Mendonça (born 30 January 1970) is a Brazilian actress. She debuted in television by acting in the 1993 telenovela Renascer in the role of an intersex woman, Buba. Debuting in cinema with Quem Matou Pixote?, her first most prominent role in films was in Foolish Heart, for which she was nominated for Best Actress at the 1st Grande Prêmio Cinema Brasil and at the Silver Condor Award.

Selected filmography
 Renascer (1993)
 Explode Coração (1995)
 Corpo Dourado (1998)
 Foolish Heart (1998)
 A Muralha (2000)
 The Three Marias (2002)
 Carandiru (2003)
 Um Só Coração (2004)
 Senhora do Destino (2004)
 Mandrake (2005)
 Querô (2007)
 A Mulher Invisível (2009)
 Viver a Vida (2009)
 O Homem do Futuro (2011)
 Sessão de Terapia (2012)
 Além do Horizonte (2013)

Selected television
 Magnifica 70 (2015–16)
 Sítio do Picapau Amarelo (2002)

References

External links

1970 births
Living people
Actresses from Rio de Janeiro (city)
Brazilian film actresses
Brazilian television actresses